In computing, an extent is a contiguous area of storage reserved for a file in a file system, represented as a range of block numbers, or tracks on count key data devices. A file can consist of zero or more extents; one file fragment requires one extent. The direct benefit is in storing each range compactly as two numbers, instead of canonically storing every block number in the range. Also, extent allocation results in less file fragmentation.

Extent-based file systems can also eliminate most of the metadata overhead of large files that would traditionally be taken up by the block-allocation tree. But because the savings are small compared to the amount of stored data (for all file sizes in general) but make up a large portion of the metadata (for large files), the overall benefits in storage efficiency and performance are slight.

In order to resist fragmentation, several extent-based file systems do allocate-on-flush. Many modern fault-tolerant file systems also do copy-on-write, although that increases fragmentation.  As a similar design, the CP/M file system uses extents as well, but those do not correspond to the definition given above. CP/M's extents appear contiguously as a single block in the combined directory/allocation table, and they do not necessarily correspond to a contiguous data area on disk.

IBM OS/360 and successors allocate files in multiples of disk tracks or cylinders. Files could originally have up to 16 extents, but this restriction has since been lifted. The initial allocation size and the size of additional extents to be allocated if required are specified by the user via Job Control Language. The system attempts to allocate the initial size as a contiguous area, although this may be split if contiguous space is not available.

Adoption 
The systems supporting filesystem extents include the following:

 APFS Apple File System
 ASM Automatic Storage Management Oracle's database-oriented filesystem
 BFS BeOS, Zeta and Haiku operating systems
 Btrfs Extent-based copy-on-write (COW) file system for Linux
 EFS Extent File System SGI's first-generation file system for Irix
 Ext4 Linux filesystem (when the configuration enables extents the default in Linux since version 2.6.23)
 Files-11 OpenVMS filesystem
 HFS and HFS Plus Hierarchical File System Apple Macintosh filesystems
 High Performance File System (HPFS)  on OS/2, eComStation and ArcaOS
 IceFS IceFileSystem optional file system for MorphOS
 JFS Journaled File System used by AIX, OS/2/eComStation/ArcaOS and Linux operating systems
 ISO 9660 Extent-based file system for optical disc media
 Microsoft SQL Server versions 2000–2008 support extents of up to 64 KB
 Multi-Programming Executive a filesystem by Hewlett-Packard
 NTFS
 OCFS2 Oracle Cluster File System a shared-disk file system for Linux
 Reiser4 Linux filesystem (in "extents" mode)
 SINTRAN III file system used by early computer company Norsk Data
 UDF Universal Disk Format standard for optical media
 VERITAS File System enabled via the pre-allocation API and CLI
 XFS SGI's second-generation file system for Irix and Linux

See also 
 Comparison of file systems

References

External links 

 Getting to know the Solaris filesystem, Part 1: Allocation and storage strategy a comparison of block-based and extent-based allocation

Computer file systems